This is a list of companies in Tallinn, Estonia. Tallinn is the capital city of Estonia.

Companies based in Tallinn

References 

Tallinn